The Aviolanda AT-21 was a target drone developed in the Netherlands by Aviolanda. Powered by a pulsejet engine, it was the Netherlands' first drone to be successfully developed, and saw limited use in the late 1950s and early 1960s.

Design and development
Developed in 1955, the AT-21 was of conventional aircraft design, with a high-mounted, constant-chord monoplane wing and a twin tail empennage. Power was provided by a SNECMA AS-11 Ecrevisse pulsejet, mounted in a fairing underneath the aircraft's fuselage; the construction of the airframe made extensive use of plastic in the nose and tail, with the center-section being of metal construction, and the wings and tail were made of foam-filled plastic with metal stabilizers and rudders.

Launch was by JATO-type booster rockets from a zero-length launch ramp; a trolley for conventional takeoff from a runway was also available. Control was by  radio commands from a remote guidance station, set up like an aircraft cockpit; if radio contact was lost, the parachute recovery system would automatically deploy. The parachutes could also be manually released at the end of a mission; the wing and tail would be separated by explosive bolts upon landing to simplify recovery and reduce the risk of damage during the process. Endurance was up to one hour, and it was possible to fit a payload of cameras for aerial reconnaissance duties.

Operational history
The first flight of the AT-21 took place in late 1955. The first Dutch drone to successfully complete development, it entered service with the Royal Dutch Navy. Production of the AT-21 continued through 1958.

Specifications

See also

References

Citations

Bibliography

AT-21
1950s Dutch special-purpose aircraft
High-wing aircraft
Single-engined jet aircraft
Target drones
Twin-tail aircraft
Aircraft first flown in 1955
Pulsejet-powered aircraft
Unmanned aerial vehicles of the Netherlands